A list of Pakistani films produced in 1962 (see 1962 in film) and in the Urdu language:

1962

See also
 1962 in Pakistan

References

External links
 Search Pakistani film - IMDB.com

1962
Pakistani
Films